Sea song or sea-song may refer to:
a sea song (genre),  a sailor's song — when expressly working songs, they are often sea shanties (a shipboard song-type which flourished in the Age of Sail's 19th century to the 20th century's first half). — As OED defined.

Music
Sea Songs, an arrangement by Ralph Vaughan Williams

Songs
"Sea Song", by Doves from their album Lost Souls, 2000
"Sea Song", by Faraquet from their album The View from This Tower, 2000
"Sea Song", by Lisa Hannigan from her album Sea Sew, 2008
"Sea Song", by Robert Wyatt from his album Rock Bottom, 1974; and which was covered by Tears for Fears on their album Songs from the Big Chair (Super Deluxe Edition), 1985

See also
Fantasia on British Sea Songs, a classical composition by Sir Henry Wood
Sea Songs for Landlocked Sailors, an EP by the rock band Tarkio
Rogue's Gallery: Pirate Ballads, Sea Songs, and Chanteys, a compilation album
Sailor’s Song (disambiguation)